Josh Albee (born September 19, 1959) is an American television actor, known for his work as a child actor during the 1970s, and for the role as the young, mute boy Caleb in the feature film, Jeremiah Johnson.

Albee remained active in acting through the early 1980s. His later work was mostly in television.

Background

Career

Filmography
 Sealab 2020 (1972) (TV series)
 Gunsmoke (2 episodes, 1971–1972) (TV)
 Jeremiah Johnson (1972)
 Lassie (3 episodes, 1972)
 Adventures of Tom Sawyer (1973) (TV)
 The Addams Family (1973) (TV series)
 Emergency! (2 episodes, 1972–1973)
 Yogi's Gang (3 episodes, 1973) (TV)
 The ABC Afternoon Playbreak  (1 episode, 1974) (TV)
 Oliver Twist (1974) (voice)
 Earthquake (1974)
 The Runaways (1975) (TV)
 The Family Holvak (1 episode, 1975) (TV)
 The Secret of Isis (1 episode, 1975) (TV)
 Helter Skelter (1976) (TV)
 The Quest (1 episode, 1976) (TV)
 A Question of Love (1978) (TV)
 Project UFO (1 episode, 1978) (TV)
 The Young and the Restless (1979–1980)
 Code Red (1981) (TV)

References

External links
 

Living people
American male child actors
1959 births
American male television actors